Holliday junction recognition protein is a protein in humans that is encoded by the HJURP gene.

References

Further reading 

Genes on human chromosome 2
Human proteins